The 2018 Finnish Athletics Championships (also known as Kalevan Kisat) were held at the Harjun stadion in Jyväskylä on 19–22 June 2018.

Results

References

Finnish Athletics Championships
Finnish Athletics Championships
Finnish Athletics Championships